Beetlejuice is a 1988 comedy horror film directed by Tim Burton.

Beetlejuice may also refer to:

Media
Beetlejuice (TV series), a 1989–1991 animated series based on the film
Beetlejuice (1990 video game), a 1990 MS-DOS video game based on the film
Beetlejuice (1991 video game), a 1991 NES video game based on the film
Beetlejuice (1992 video game), a 1992 video game for Nintendo Game Boy based on the animated series
Beetlejuice (musical), a 2018 musical based on the film

People with the nickname
Lori Lightfoot, 56th mayor of Chicago, pejoratively compared and nicknamed to "Beetlejuice" by some critics
Beetlejuice, a ring name of the professional wrestler Art Barr
Beetlejuice (entertainer), an entertainer seen on The Howard Stern Show, real name Lester Green

See also
Betelgeuse (disambiguation)
Beatlejuice, a Beatles cover band